

Events
Vito Genovese, after living in Sicily for several years, returns to the United States.  He is finally tried for the 1937 murder of Ferdinand Boccia and is acquitted. Soon after the trial, Genovese establishes himself in the Luciano crime family where he would compete for dominance against Frank Costello.
February 24 – Cleveland racketeer Nathan Weisenberg, the "Slots King of Ohio", whose monopoly on vending and slot machines stretches as far as Arizona and Colorado, is murdered by members of the Cleveland crime syndicate.

Births
Antonino Cina, Sicilian mafia regional boss and commission member
Biagio DiGiacomo, Patriarca crime family caporegime
Gerard Pappa, Genovese crime family soldier
Lawrence Ricci, Genovese crime family caporegime

Deaths
February 24 – Nathan Weisenberg, Cleveland gambling racketeer
August 23 – James Belcastro, Chicago Outfit extortionist

Organized crime
Years in organized crime